WRKZ (99.7 FM), branded 99.7 The Blitz, is a commercial active rock radio station licensed to Columbus, Ohio, and serving the Columbus metro area.  It is owned by the North American Broadcasting Company, along with sister stations 920 WMNI and 103.9 WJKR.  The studios are on Dublin Road (U.S. Route 33).  

WRKZ has an effective radiated power (ERP) of 20,000 watts.  The transmitter is on Twin Rivers Drive, sharing a tower with WCMH-TV channel 4.

History

Easy Listening, Country and Classic Rock
Its original call sign was WMNI-FM, the FM counterpart to WMNI 920 AM. The two stations mostly simulcast an easy listening format. 

By 1978 the station's call letters were WRMZ and, in the early '80s, it started to broadcast a country music format.  From 1987 to 1992, the station was known as WMGG, Magic 99-7, and played classic rock.

The Blitz: 1992–2008
The Blitz began at 4 p.m. on July 2, 1992.  WBZX aired an active rock format.  In morning drive time, it carried The Howard Stern Show, syndicated from New York City from 1997 to 2005.

The Rock: 2008–10
On April 3, 2008, WBZX began stunting with radio static and a voice mentioning that the "station is rebooting". The last song played on The Blitz was Breaking Benjamin's "Until the End". The next day, at 5:00 P.M., WBZX relaunched as The Rock, along with the call letters changing to WRKZ. The new station premiered with Nirvana's "Smells Like Teen Spirit". The Rock still had the active rock format, but it focused less on new music and played popular rock music from the 1980s.

The station added the syndicated The Bob & Tom Show during the Morning Drive in December 2008.

During the last few months as The Rock, the station added rock songs from the '60s and '70s into its playlist, shifting it into a Mainstream Rock direction. Only a few months later, the station hosted its first-ever "Town Hall Meeting", with Program Director Hal Fish and on-air personalities Ronni Hunter and Blazor taking calls, emails and texts as to what Columbus area listeners wanted more and less of on 99.7. A week later, on April 1, 2010, they once again went to the airwaves and detailed an "Action Plan" as to what would happen on the station in the following weeks, including the return of such Blitz-era staples as "Choose It Or Lose It" as well as a showcase for local musical talent. In addition, a website was launched at blitzorrock.com to determine whether or not listeners wanted to keep the station named The Rock or for The Blitz to make a return.

The Blitz: 2010–present

On April 22, 2010, at a "Blitz or Rock Reveal Party" it was announced that the station would be once again called The Blitz. It premiered with Mudvayne's "Happy?", followed by Disturbed's "Down with the Sickness". Along with the changes, it was also announced that The Bob & Tom Show would be dropped in a few weeks and be replaced by a local morning show. The show that replaced it was Blazor and Mo in the morning, which ironically was the same show that Bob & Tom replaced in December 2008.

In early December 2011, Mo (Maurice Jovan) was no longer on the air.  On February 6, 2012, Mark Blazor resigned.

References

External links

RKZ
Radio stations established in 1962
1962 establishments in Ohio
Active rock radio stations in the United States